Cash Cab is a British game show that originally aired from 13 June 2005 to 29 June 2006 on ITV1. The remaining fourteen episodes of the second series aired on Challenge from 22 to 30 March 2007. The original programme that launched the worldwide Cash Cab franchise, it was hosted by John Moody. The questions were asked in voice over style by Annabel Raftery. The show was devised by Adam Wood and Mat Steiner.

Gameplay
The show's host initially poses as an ordinary taxi driver and drives around the major cities of the United Kingdom in a cab. The show pays its passengers for correctly answering standard general knowledge questions. Contestants are recruited in advance but are not told that the quiz will be taking place in the cab, so although the "pick-ups" are not as random as they appear on screen, the contestants are genuinely surprised when the taxi turns out to be the Cash Cab. (This differs from some editions, most notably the Canadian and American versions, wherein the contestants are generally chosen at random and are usually asked on camera if they wish to play or not once the rules are explained to them.)

The contestants tell the driver their destination before getting into the taxi and are not allowed to change it. They'll then have the distance they'll need to travel to answer questions. The first five questions are relatively easy and worth £10 each, the next five are a little harder and worth £50, the next seven, even harder and worth £100, and any question after that is worth £500. If the contestant gets three questions wrong, they'll lose the money they have won up to that point and must leave the cab immediately.

The host of Cash Cab, John Moody, is a genuine qualified taxi driver, and has an easygoing presenting style.

Transmissions

International versions

See also
 Taxicab Confessions
 BrainRush

References

External links
 
 

2005 British television series debuts
2007 British television series endings
2000s British game shows
Cash Cab
English-language television shows
ITV game shows
Television series by All3Media